Giorgia Meloni (born 15 January 1977) is an Italian politician who has been serving as the prime minister of Italy since 22 October 2022, the first woman to hold this position. A member of the Chamber of Deputies since 2006, she has led the Brothers of Italy (FdI) political party since 2014, and she has been the president of the European Conservatives and Reformists Party since 2020.

In 1992, Meloni joined the Youth Front, the youth wing of the Italian Social Movement (MSI), a neo-fascist political party founded in 1946 by former followers of Italian fascist dictator Benito Mussolini. She later became the national leader of Student Action, the student movement of the National Alliance (AN), a post-fascist party that became the MSI's legal successor in 1995 and moved towards national conservatism. She was a councillor of the Province of Rome from 1998 to 2002, after which she became the president of Youth Action, the youth wing of AN. In 2008, she was appointed Italian Minister of Youth in the Berlusconi IV Cabinet, a role which she held until 2011. In 2012, she co-founded FdI, a legal successor to AN, and became its president in 2014. She unsuccessfully ran in the 2014 European Parliament election and the 2016 Rome municipal election. After the 2018 Italian general election, she led FdI in opposition during the entire 18th Italian legislature. FdI grew its popularity in opinion polls, particularly during the management of the COVID-19 pandemic in Italy by the Draghi Cabinet, a national unity government to which FdI was the only opposition party. Following the fall of the Draghi government, FdI won the 2022 Italian general election.

A right-wing populist and nationalist, her political positions have been described as far right, which she rejects. She describes herself as a Christian and a conservative, and she claims to defend "God, fatherland, and family". She is opposed to abortion, euthanasia, same-sex marriage, and LGBT parenting, saying that nuclear families are exclusively headed by male–female pairs. Her discourse includes femonationalist rhetoric and criticism of globalism. Meloni supports a naval blockade to halt immigration, and she has been accused of xenophobia and Islamophobia; she has blamed neo-colonialism as a cause behind the European migrant crisis. A supporter of NATO, she maintains Eurosceptic views regarding the European Union, which she describes as Eurorealist, and was in favour of better relations with Russia before the 2022 Russian invasion of Ukraine, after which she pledged to keep sending arms to Ukraine. However, Meloni has expressed controversial views, such as praising Mussolini when she was 19. In 2020, she praised Giorgio Almirante, a civil minister in Mussolini's Italian Social Republic who produced racist propaganda and co-founded the MSI. Nevertheless, Meloni has said that she and her party condemn both the suppression of democracy and the introduction of the Italian racial laws by the fascist regime. In 2022, according to Forbes, Meloni was the seventh most powerful woman in the world.

Early life 
Giorgia Meloni was born in Rome on 15 January 1977. Her father was from Sardinia and her mother is from Sicily. Her father, a tax advisor, left the family when she was one year old in 1978, by moving to the Canary Islands; 17 years later, he was convicted for drug trafficking and sentenced to 9 years in a Spanish prison in 1995. He last contacted Meloni in 2006, when she became the Vice-President of the Chamber of Deputies. She grew up in the working-class district of Garbatella. She has a sister, Arianna, who was born in 1975 and is married to Francesco Lollobrigida, the Italian Minister of Agriculture since 22 October 2022.

In 1992, at 15 years of age, Meloni joined the Youth Front, the youth wing of the Italian Social Movement (MSI), a neo-fascist political party that dissolved in 1995. During this time, she founded the student coordination  (The Ancestors), which took part in the protest against the public education reform promoted by minister Rosa Russo Iervolino. In 1996, she became the national leader of Student Action, the student movement of the post-fascist National Alliance (AN), the national-conservative heir of the MSI, representing this movement in the Student Associations Forum established by the Italian Ministry of Education.

In 1998, after winning the primary election, Meloni was elected as a councillor of the Province of Rome, holding this position until 2002. She was elected national director in 2000 and became the first woman president of Youth Action, the AN youth wing, in 2004.

Meloni graduated from Rome's Amerigo Vespucci Institute (AVI) in 1996. After her election to the Italian Parliament in 2006, she declared in her curriculum vitae that she obtained a high school diploma in languages with the final mark of 60/60. This created some controversy, as the AVI was not a foreign language high school and was not qualified to issue a diploma in languages; instead, it was a technical high school specialised in the tourist industry, to which she later clarified.

Political career

Minister of Youth 

In the 2006 Italian general election, she was elected to the Chamber of Deputies as a member of the National Alliance (AN), where she became its youngest ever vice-president. In the same year, she started to work as a journalist. In 2006, Meloni defended the laws passed by the Berlusconi III Cabinet that benefited companies of the prime minister and media mogul Silvio Berlusconi and also delayed ongoing trials involving him. Meloni stated "it is necessary to contextualise them. Those are laws that Silvio Berlusconi made for himself. But they are perfectly fair laws."

In 2008, at 31 years old, she was appointed Italian Minister of Youth in the Berlusconi IV Cabinet, a position she held until 16 November 2011, when Berlusconi was forced to resign as the prime minister amid a financial crisis and public protests. She was the second youngest-ever minister in the history of united Italy. In August 2008, she invited Italian athletes to boycott the opening ceremony of the Beijing Olympic Games in disagreement with the Chinese policy implemented towards Tibet; this statement was criticised by Berlusconi, as well as the foreign affairs minister Franco Frattini. In 2009, her party merged with Forza Italia (FI) into The People of Freedom (PdL) and she took over the presidency of the united party's youth section, called Young Italy. In the same year, she voted in favour of a decree law against euthanasia.

In November 2010, on behalf of the ministry, she presented a 300 million euro package called the Right to the Future. It was aimed at investing in young people and contained five initiatives, including incentives for new entrepreneurs, bonuses in favour of temporary workers and loans for deserving students. In November 2012, she announced her bid to contest the PdL leadership against Angelino Alfano, in opposition to the party's support of the Monti Cabinet. After the cancellation of the primaries, she teamed up with fellow politicians Ignazio La Russa and Guido Crosetto to set out an anti-Monti policy, asking for renewal within the party and being also critical of the leadership of Berlusconi.

Brothers of Italy 
In December 2012, Meloni, La Russa, and Crosetto founded a new political movement, Brothers of Italy (FdI), whose name comes from the words of the Italian national anthem. In the 2013 Italian general election, she stood as part of Berlusconi's centre-right coalition and received 2.0% of the vote and 9 seats. She was re-elected to the Chamber of Deputies for Lombardy and was later appointed the party's leader in the house, a position that she would hold until 2014, when she resigned to dedicate herself to the party. She was succeeded by Fabio Rampelli.

President of Brothers of Italy 

In March 2014, she became president of FdI, and in April she was nominated for the 2014 European Parliament election in Italy as the leader of the FdI in all five constituencies. FdI party obtained 3.7% of the votes, not exceeding the threshold of 4%, and she did not become a Member of the European Parliament; she received 348,700 votes. On 4 November 2015, she founded Our Land – Italians with Giorgia Meloni, a conservative political committee in support of her campaigns. Our Land was a parallel organisation to FdI, and aimed at enlarging FdI's popular base.

On 30 January 2016, she participated in the Family Day, an anti-LGBT rights demonstration, declaring herself against LGBT adoption. At the same Family Day, she announced that she was pregnant; her daughter Ginevra was born on 16 September. In the 2016 Rome municipal election in June, she ran for mayor with the support of Us with Salvini, a political party led by Matteo Salvini, and in opposition to the candidate supported by Berlusconi's Forza Italia (FI), Alfio Marchini. In May 2016, she promised to name a street after Giorgio Almirante if elected, causing controversy among the local Jewish community and the anti-fascist ANPI. Meloni won 20.6% of the vote, almost twice that of FI's candidate, but she did not qualify for the run-off, while FdI obtained 12.3% of the vote.

During the campaign for the 2016 Italian constitutional referendum on the reform promoted by Renzi's government, Meloni founded the "No, Thanks" committee and participated in numerous television debates, including one against the then prime minister Matteo Renzi. As "No" won with almost 60% of the votes on 4 December, Meloni called for snap elections. When Renzi resigned the next day, she withheld confidence from the next government led by Paolo Gentiloni on 12 December. The 2–3 December 2017 congress of FdI in Trieste saw the re-election of Meloni as president of the party, as well as a renewal of the party logo and the joining of Daniela Santanchè, a long-time right-wing politician.

As party leader, she decided to form the alliance with the League (Lega), led by Salvini, launching several political campaigns with him against the centre-left government led by the Democratic Party (PD), placing FdI in Eurosceptic and right-wing populist positions. In the 2018 Italian general election, FdI stood as part of the centre-right coalition, with Berlusconi's FI, Salvini's Lega, and Raffaele Fitto's Us with Italy. Meloni's party obtained 4.4% of the vote and more than three times the seats won in 2013. She was elected to the Chamber of Deputies for the single-member constituency of Latina, Lazio, with 41% of the vote. The centre-right coalition, in which the League emerged as the main political force, won a plurality of seats in the Chamber of Deputies; as no political group or party won an outright majority, it resulted in a hung parliament.

On 19 October 2019, she participated in the Italian Pride rally in Rome against the newly formed Conte II Cabinet. In her speech, she criticised the proposal to replace on the Italian identity cards of minors the wording father and mother with parent 1 and parent 2, concluding with the slogan "I am Giorgia. I'm a woman, I'm a mother, I'm Italian, I'm Christian". This slogan was remixed by two Milanese DJs, becoming a disco-trash catchphrase with millions of views, imitations, and memes on social media, even winning a gold disc. By her own admission in her autobiography, the media and viral success of the remixed music video, having lost the original satirical intention in favour of the LGBT community with which it had been created, greatly increased her popularity as a politician, who she said was suddenly transformed "from a boring politician into a curious pop phenomenon".

In February 2021, she joined the Aspen Institute, an international think tank headquartered in Washington, D.C., which includes many financiers, businessmen, and politicians, such as Giulio Tremonti. On 19 February 2021, the University of Siena professor Giovanni Gozzini insulted Meloni calling her vulgar names from a radio; both the president Sergio Mattarella and the prime minister Mario Draghi phoned Meloni and stigmatised Gozzini, who was suspended by the board of his university.

In October 2021, Meloni signed the Madrid Charter, a 2020 document that describes left-wing groups as enemies of Ibero-America involved in a "criminal project" that are "under the umbrella of the Cuban regime". It was drafted by Vox, a Spanish ultranationalist party. She also took part at Vox's party congress, where she said: "Yes to the natural family. No to the LGBT lobby. Yes to sexual identity. No to gender ideology ... no to Islamist violence, yes to secure borders, no to mass migration ... no to big international finance ... no to the bureaucrats of Brussels!" In February 2022, Meloni spoke at the annual Conservative Political Action Conference in Florida. She told the attending American conservative activists and officials they must defend their views against progressives.

2022 Italian general election 

Heading into the 2022 Italian general election, a snap election that was called after the 2022 Italian government crisis, it was agreed among the centre-right coalition that the leader of the party receiving the most votes would be put forward as the prime minister candidate. As of July 2022, FdI was the first party in the coalition according to opinion polling, and she was widely expected to become Prime Minister of Italy if the centre-right coalition obtained an absolute majority in Parliament, which would be the most right-wing government in the history of the Italian Republic according to some academics. In an attempt to moderate herself to placate fears among those who describe FdI as neo-fascist or far right, including fears within the European Commission that she could lead Italy towards Hungary under Viktor Orbán, Meloni told the foreign press that Italian fascism is history. As president of the European Conservatives and Reformists Party since 2020, she said she shared the experiences and values of the Conservative Party in the United Kingdom, Likud in Israel, and the Republican Party in the United States. Critics were sceptical of her claims, citing her speeches on immigration and LGBT rights. She campaigned for lower taxes, less European bureaucracy, and a halt to immigration through a naval blockade, saying she would put national interests first.

In a record-low voter turnout election, exit polls projected that the centre-right coalition would win a majority of seats in the 2022 general election. Meloni was projected to be the winner of the election with FdI receiving a plurality of seats, and per agreement with the centre-right coalition, which held that the largest party in the coalition would nominate the next prime minister, she was the frontrunner and would become the country's first female prime minister. The PD, head of the centre-left coalition, conceded defeat shortly after the exit polls, and Hungary's Orbán, Poland's Mateusz Morawiecki, United Kingdom's Liz Truss, and Marine Le Pen, former leader of National Rally (RN) in France, congratulated Meloni. European radical right parties and leaders, such as Alternative for Germany and Vox, also celebrated Meloni's results. After many years of absence from politics, Gianfranco Fini, former leader of the MSI and AN during the early years of Meloni's political career, expressed satisfaction for her victory, said he had voted for her party, and described her as an anti-fascist, despite her rejection of the label, which she considers to be political.

Observers have debated how right-wing a Meloni-led government would be, and which label and position on the political spectrum would be more accurate or realistic. Many variously described it as Italy's first far-right-led government since World War II, and Meloni as the first far-right leader since Benito Mussolini, and some academics also described it as the most right-wing government since 1945. Many questioned its direction, citing Berlusconi's and Salvini's Russian ties, in contrast to Meloni's Atlanticism. Others, such as Sky News, while citing Meloni's and her party's neo-fascist roots, disagreed with the far-right label and said: "Giorgia Meloni is not a fascist." Steve Sedwick of CNBC summarised the discussion, saying: "Have we got a centre-right coalition, have we got a right coalition, have we got a far-right coalition, or have we got a fascist coalition? I have seen all four printed, depending on who you read."

Prime Minister of Italy

Government formation 

Immediately after the first meeting of the new legislature, tensions began to grow within the centre-right coalition. On 13 October, Berlusconi refused to support Ignazio La Russa, FdI's candidacy to be President of the Senate of the Republic. He succeeded in being elected by obtaining 116 votes out of 206 in the first round thanks to the support from opposition parties to the centre-right coalition. Tensions further grew, in particular between Berlusconi and Meloni, whom Berlusconi described as "patronising, overbearing, arrogant ... [and] offensive" in a series of written notes in the Senate. In the following days, after meetings between parties' leader, tensions loosened and the centre-right coalition parties reached an agreement on the formation of the new cabinet.

On 20 October, consultations between President Sergio Mattarella and parties officially began. On the following day, delegates from FdI, the League, FI, and Civics of Italy–Us Moderates–MAIE, announced to Mattarella they had reached an agreement to form a coalition government with Meloni as Prime Minister. In the afternoon, Mattarella summoned Meloni to the Quirinal Palace, asking her to form a new government. She accepted the task and on the same day announced the composition of her cabinet, which was officially sworn in on 22 October. She is the first woman to hold the office of Prime Minister of Italy.

On 25 October, Meloni gave her first official speech as Prime Minister in front of the Chamber of Deputies, before the confidence vote on her cabinet. During her speech, she stressed the weight of being the first woman to serve as head of the Italian government. She thanked several Italian women including Tina Anselmi, Samantha Cristoforetti, Grazia Deledda, Oriana Fallaci, Nilde Iotti, Rita Levi-Montalcini, and Maria Montessori, who she said, "with the boards of their own examples, built the ladder that today allows me to climb and break the heavy glass ceiling placed over our heads." The government won the confidence vote with a comfortable majority in both houses.

Domestic policies 

One of the first measures implemented by the government regarded COVID-19 and concerned with the complete removal of the COVID-19 vaccination certificate, known in Italy as the Green Pass; moreover, the non-vaccinated doctors were re-integrated into service. On 31 October, the government approved a decree providing for a penalty of up to six years of imprisonment for illegal parties and rallies. Despite being officially presented as a decree against illegal rave parties, the law was applicable to any illegal gathering that the public authority deemed dangerous, which garnered criticism, including from jurist Vitalba Azzolini. The decree also caused a lot of protests from opposition parties and civil rights associations, and was also contested by FI. According to Amnesty International, the decree "risked undermining the right to peaceful protest." The Meloni government has rejected the accusations and announced that it will accept minor changes to the text in Parliament. In the first weeks after taking office, Meloni implemented stricter policies than previous governments regarding the fight against illegal immigration.

From an economic point of view, Meloni and her government have decided to prevent the increase in energy prices, in continuity with her predecessor Mario Draghi, by lowering prices, giving subsidies to families and businesses and making new drilling decisions in the Italian seas to increase national gas production. The government decided also to increase the cash ceiling from €2,000 to €5,000.

In late December 2022, Meloni announced that Elisabetta Casellati, Minister for Constitutional Reforms, would meet with the opposition parties to officially begin the roadmap towards a presidential system.

On 26 February 2023, a boat carrying migrants sank amidst harsh weather conditions while trying to land on the coast of Steccato di Cutro, near Crotone, in the region of Calabria. The boat was carrying between 143 and 200 migrants when it sank, of whom at least 86 died, including 12 children, becoming one of the deadliest naval disaster in recent years. Meloni expressed her "deep sorrow for the many human lives torn away by human traffickers", and condemned the "exchange" of migrants' lives for "the 'price' of a ticket paid by them in the false prospect for a safe voyage". On 1 March, the new leader of the Democratic Party, Elly Schlein, as well as other leftist opposition parties asked for the resignation of interior minister Matteo Piantedosi.

Foreign policy 

The first foreign leader met by Meloni was the French president Emmanuel Macron, who was in Rome on 23 October to meet president Mattarella and the Pope, and had a bilateral meeting with Meloni, primarily focused on the ongoing energy crisis and the Russian invasion of Ukraine. On 3 November, Meloni met European Union (EU) leaders such as Ursula von der Leyen, Charles Michel, Paolo Gentiloni, Roberta Metsola, and other politicians in Brussels.

On 7 November, Meloni took part in her first international summit, the United Nations COP27 in Sharm El Sheik, Egypt. During her speech, Meloni stated: "Italy remains strongly convinced of its commitment to decarbonisation in compliance with the Paris Agreement. We must diversify energy suppliers, in close collaboration with African countries." During the conference, the prime minister also had a bilateral meeting with the Egyptian president Abdel Fattah el-Sisi. In the following week, Meloni participated in the G20 summit in Bali, Indonesia, where she had her first bilateral meeting with the U.S. President Joe Biden on 15 November.

In January 2023, Meloni visited Algeria, where she met president Abdelmadjid Tebboune with whom she signed a deal regarding gas supply to Italy. Thanks to this deal, the North African country will become Italy's largest gas supplier.

On 22 February 2023, Meloni visited Ukraine and met with President Volodymyr Zelenskyy to discuss about the ongoing Russian invasion. Meloni also visited Bucha, in the suburbs of Kyiv, where the Russian forces killed more than 400 Ukrainians in March 2022. The prime minister stressed that Ukraine can count on Italy, adding "we have been with Ukraine from the beginning and will be until the end." On 2 March, Meloni visited India, where she met Prime Minister Narendra Modi and President Droupadi Murmu. During a press conference, Meloni praised Modi and his policies, describing him as the "most loved leader in the world".

Political positions 
Observers have described Meloni's political positions as far right; in August 2018, Friedel Taube wrote in Deutsche Welle that "Giorgia Meloni has a long history in far-right politics." In a July 2022 interview with Nicholas Farrell of The Spectator, Meloni rejected descriptions of her politics as far right, calling it a smear campaign by her opponents and cited British conservative philosopher Roger Scruton as one of her influences. She has also described herself as a mainstream conservative. Additionally, Meloni has been described as hard right, right-wing populist, and nationalist.

Meloni has been described as being close to Viktor Orbán, the Prime Minister of Hungary and leader of Fidesz, National Rally in France, and Vox political party in Spain, representatives of the Law and Justice party in Poland, and the Republican Party in the United States. Meloni self-described her political party, Brothers of Italy (FdI), as a mainstream conservative party, and she has downplayed its post-fascist roots. She is in favour of presidentialism and supports the change of the Constitution of Italy.

Social issues 

Meloni opposes abortion, euthanasia, and laws that recognise same-sex marriage, and describes herself as "pro-family". She has said she "wouldn't change" the abortion law in Italy but wanted to apply more fully the part of the law "about prevention", such as permitting conscientious objection doctors to refuse to carry them out. She also stated that the recognition of same-sex unions in Italy is good enough, and she said it was something she would not change; in 2016, while she said she would respect the law if elected mayor of Rome, she had supported a referendum to abrogate the civil-union law. At a rally at the Piazza del Popolo in October 2019, she spoke against same-sex parenting; her speech became viral on Italian social media platforms. During a February 2016 interview to Le Iene, an Italian television show, she had also said that she would "rather not have a gay child".

She is opposed to the DDL Zan, an anti-homophobia law that would expand the Mancino law to cover LGBT discrimination, declaring in 2020 that "there is no homophobia" in Italy. She is also opposed to surrogacy, which is pejoratively known in Italian as utero in affitto, and she has pushed in Parliament for a law to make it a "universal crime". Meloni is supportive of the anti-gender movement, based on Catholic theology in the 1990s that condemns social positions not approved by the Catholic Church, including gender studies, and she is sceptical of what she calls "gender ideology"; she says it is being taught in schools, and that it attacks female identity and motherhood. She is supportive of changing the Constitution of Italy to make it illegal for same-sex couples to adopt children. In March 2018, she criticised The Walt Disney Company for the decision to represent a gay couple in the musical fantasy film Frozen II. On Facebook, she wrote: "Enough! We are sick of it! Take your hands off the children."

Feminism 

She sees feminism as an ideological tool against right-wing politics rather than in pro-women terms and has described herself as "a person for women". In her 2011 book We Believe, she wrote: "I am a right-wing woman, and I proudly support women's issues. In recent years we have had to suffer contempt and racism by feminists. ... Perhaps as far as feminism is conceived in this way, it is more a question of ideology than of gender and substance." She is opposed to pink quotas and has denied being anti-women as accused by some critics. Giorgia Serughetti, a political philosopher and author of The Conservative Wind, said that femonationalism is working for Meloni.

The possibility of Meloni becoming the first woman to become Prime Minister of Italy had been widely discussed both prior to and after the 2022 Italian general election. Some women did not see this as a victory due to her political positions, while others saw it at least partly in a positive light, and a few others called her a feminist despite Meloni's rejection of the label. Prior to the election, former U.S. Secretary of State Hillary Clinton commented: "The election of the first woman prime minister in a country always represents a break with the past, and that is certainly a good thing." This prompted a response from some critics and observers, including historians Ruth Ben-Ghiat and David Broder. Ben-Ghiat wrote: "Meloni would also represent continuity with Italy's darkest episode." For her part, Meloni declared herself ready to govern and criticised feminists.

Immigration and multiculturalism 
Meloni has criticised Italy's approach towards illegal immigrants, calling for a zero-tolerance policy, and she wants to blockade migrants from reaching Italian ports, and boost the birth rate of Italian nationals to ease the need for migrant labour. She is opposed to birthright citizenship proposals, which would give citizenship including education rights to immigrants born and living in Italy. She has linked illegal immigration and crime, and refugee arrivals to human trafficking and prostitution. Amid the 2022 escalation of the Russo-Ukrainian War, Meloni said she supported to give refugee status to those coming from a war-shaken country but not to asylum seekers. She said: "It's time to call things by their name, to give refugee status to those fleeing war, women, and children, perhaps doing the opposite with those who aren't refugees." In August 2022, she reposted a pixelated video on Twitter that shows a woman being raped by an asylum seeker. The victim of the violence decried the publication of the video and said she was recognised by the video posted. After receiving backlash, Meloni defended herself by accusing other politicians of not having condemned the rape itself.

Meloni has blamed neo-colonialism for Africa's underdevelopment and the 2015 European migrant crisis, and she said she favours co-operation over what she termed France's neocolonialism. She has been considered as opposed to the reception of migrants, as well as to multiculturalism, and she has been accused of making xenophobic statements, as well as of Islamophobia. In 2018, she said she would welcome Venezuelans, saying they are Christians and often of Italian origins. She has often criticised George Soros and what she terms globalists, at times reflecting the views of Soros conspiracy theories, once saying: "When you are a slave, you act in Soros's interests." She has endorsed the Great Replacement, a white nationalist conspiracy theory. She also believes there is a planned mass migration from Africa to Europe for the purpose of replacing and eliminating Italians, an antisemitic, white genocide, and far-right conspiracy theory known as the Kalergi Plan. She has described pro-immigration policies as part of an alleged left-wing conspiracy to "replace Italians with immigrants". In January 2017, she called immigration to Italy "ethnic substitution".

Foreign issues 

Meloni voted in favour of the 2011 military intervention in Libya; in 2019, she criticised the French rationale for the intervention, stating it was because of Muammar Gaddafi's opposition to the CFA franc. She is critical of Italian relations with Saudi Arabia and Qatar, stating that these countries "systematically and deliberately spread fundamentalist theories that are the main causes of the growth of Islamic fundamentalism". She opposed the decision to host the Supercoppa Italiana final in Saudi Arabia, and stated that Italy should actively raise the issue of human rights in Saudi Arabia. However, upon taking office, Meloni reversed her position, with her government stating it was "keen to maintain the excellent relationship with Saudi Arabia" yet still calling for a "firm reaction" against Qatar to which several Italians were accused of involvement in Qatargate. Similarly, in 2021, Meloni stated her party  "denounced the authoritarian, Islamist direction Erdogan's Turkey has taken for years and asked the EU to withdraw Ankara's status as a candidate country", but upon taking office, pursued closer ties with the Turkish government, due to Italy's interests in Libya, cooperation in stopping migration, shared nationalist values and common disagreement with French foreign policy. Meloni advocated for the expulsion of the Indian Ambassador to Italy as a result of the Enrica Lexie case, and she urged Alessandro Del Piero to refuse to play in the Indian Super League until the detained Italian marines were returned. Following the Asia Bibi blasphemy case, Meloni criticised what she called the "silence of the West" and advocated a stronger stance by the international community against human rights violations in Pakistan.

Prior to the 2022 Russian invasion of Ukraine, she was in favour of better relations with Russia and supported lifting sanctions on the Russian Federation in 2014. In 2018, she congratulated Vladimir Putin for his re-election as president. In her 2021 biography book, she wrote that Russia under Putin defends European values and Christian identity. She has since condemned the invasion and pledged to keep sending arms to Ukraine, and moved towards Atlanticism. She is supportive of NATO, although she maintains Eurosceptic views towards the EU, having also previously advocated a withdrawal from the eurozone. She rejects the Eurosceptic label, favouring the Eurorealism of a confederal Europe of sovereign nations. A critic of China, she is a supporter of closer ties between Italy and Taiwan. She is a controversial figure in Croatia due to her Italian irredentist statements in which she claimed Dalmatia and Istria, and for being opposed to Croatian entry into the EU due to the unresolved dispute concerning properties of exiled Italians after World War II from these two Croatian regions.

COVID-19 pandemic and vaccines 
Meloni has exhibited support for vaccine hesitancy, such as not vaccinating her daughter during the COVID-19 pandemic in Italy because "it's not a religion". She has been criticised due to her statements on vaccines and COVID-19, stating the probability of someone aged 0–19 dying from COVID-19 was the same as being struck by lightning. After her party won the 2022 Italian general election, they pledged to review the positions taken by the Italian government during the COVID-19 pandemic and end the COVID-19 vaccine mandate in place for health care workers.

Relationship with fascism 
Meloni has expressed statements that generated controversy. In an interview to the French newscast  when she was 19, she praised Italian dictator Benito Mussolini as "a good politician, in that everything he did, he did for Italy", and as the best politician of the last 50 years. Segre said that she and Almirante are incompatible and the comune had to make a choice. In May 2020, Meloni praised Almirante as a "great politician", as well as "a patriot". He was the co-founder of the Italian Social Movement (MSI), who had a long post-war political career until retiring in 1987. During World War II, he was a wartime collaborator as a civil minister of the Italian Social Republic (RSI), a Nazi puppet state, as well as editor-in-chief of the antisemitic and racist magazine , which published the "Manifesto of Race" in 1938. As a minister in 2009, Meloni visited Yad Vashem in Israel, and she has also said as FdI party leader that her party "handed fascism over to history for decades now" and it "unambiguously condemns the suppression of democracy and the ignominious anti-Jewish laws".

Meloni has tried to distance herself from her close ties to Roberto Jonghi Lavarini, a far-right Milanese politician and entrepreneur known as the "Black Baron".

After the formation of FdI in 2012, she decided to add the tricolour flame to the party flag, a neo-fascist symbol associated with the MSI, which derived its name and ideals from the RSI as a "violent, socializing, and revolutionary republican" variant of Italian fascism established as a Nazi German puppet state by Mussolini in 1943. The tricolour flame is said to represent Mussolini's remains, where a flame is always burning on his tomb in Predappio. Heading into the 2022 general election, Segre told Pagine Ebraiche that Meloni should remove the tricolour flame from the party's logo. FdI's co-founder Ignazio La Russa rejected this view, and Meloni ignored the request, keeping the tricolour flame.

Observers, including historians Ruth Ben-Ghiat, David Broder, and Laurence Bertrand Dorléac, said that Meloni and FdI have been ambiguous about their fascist past, at times rejecting it and at other times minimising it, and that this has helped to rebrand both herself and her party. Responding to the 2021 Fanpage report, she minimised the investigation and refused to remove openly neo-fascist members of FdI. In December 2021, FdI's Alfredo Catapano and Luigi Rispoli were among former MSI members who did a Roman salute, which was condemned by the ANPI. Rispoli told Fanpage: "I believe in the New Right and in the efforts Giorgia Meloni is making in Brothers of Italy. It makes me wonder, frankly, this clamour." Shortly before the 2022 general election, she sacked a member that openly praised Adolf Hitler. FdI had also distanced itself from the Ascoli Piceno party section after it celebrated the anniversary of the March on Rome in 2019.

On 25 October 2022, on the occasion of the vote of confidence of the Parliament at the government, Meloni in her speech before the deputies said: "Freedom and democracy are the distinctive elements of contemporary European civilization in which I have always recognized myself. And therefore, despite the instrumental argument of my opponents, I have never had sympathy for undemocratic regimes. For any regime, including fascism. Exactly as I have always considered the racial laws of 1938 the lowest point in Italian history, a shame that will mark our people forever".

Personal life 
Meloni has a daughter, Ginevra, with her partner Andrea Giambruno, a journalist who works for Silvio Berlusconi's Mediaset TV channel. She is a Roman Catholic and has used her religious identity in part to help build her national brand. In a 2019 speech to a rally in Rome, she said: "I am Giorgia. I'm a woman, I'm a mother, I'm Italian, I'm Christian." Despite her Christian beliefs and championing traditional family values, Meloni defended herself not being married to her child's father. In September 2022, she reportedly continued to embrace the old Italian fascist slogan "God, fatherland and family". She has said she resents being linked to Italy's fascist past.

Meloni is an avid fan of fantasy, particularly J. R. R. Tolkien's The Lord of the Rings. As a youth activist with the Italian Social Movement (MSI), she attended the Camp Hobbit festival and sang along with the far-right folk band , named after The Fellowship of the Ring. Later, she named her political conference Atreju, after the hero of the novel The Neverending Story. Meloni told The New York Times: "I think that Tolkien could say better than we can what conservatives believe in." Apart from Tolkien, she is fond of British conservative philosopher Roger Scruton and has said: "If I were British I would be a Tory." In addition to her native Italian, she speaks English, French and Spanish.

Electoral history 
Meloni has been a member of Parliament since 2006, being most recently re-elected in 2022.

First-past-the-post elections 
Meloni has won first-past-the-post elections for a parliamentary seat in both 2018 and 2022.

Municipal elections 
Meloni has lost the municipal election to become mayor of Rome in 2016.

Bibliography

See also 
 Conservatism in Italy
 Far-right politics in Italy

References

External links 

 

 
1977 births
21st-century Italian women politicians
Italian anti-same-sex-marriage activists
Brothers of Italy politicians
Critics of Islamism
Deputies of Legislature XV of Italy
Deputies of Legislature XVI of Italy
Deputies of Legislature XVII of Italy
Deputies of Legislature XVIII of Italy
Deputies of Legislature XIX of Italy
Female critics of feminism
Italian anti-communists
Italian eurosceptics
Italian nationalists
Italian neo-fascist politicians
Italian people of Sardinian descent
Italian Roman Catholics
Living people
Meloni Cabinet
National Alliance (Italy) politicians
The People of Freedom politicians
People of Sicilian descent
Politicians from Rome
Prime Ministers of Italy
Right-wing populism in Italy
Signers of the Madrid Charter
Women government ministers of Italy
Women members of the Chamber of Deputies (Italy)
Women opposition leaders
Women prime ministers